Marco Chiudinelli and Michael Lammer were the defending champions, but they were eliminated by Wesley Moodie and Dick Norman already in the first round.
Unseeded Johan Brunström and Jarkko Nieminen won in the final 6–3, 6–7(4–7), [11–9], against 4th-seeded Marcelo Melo and Bruno Soares.

Seeds

Draw

Draw

References
 Doubles Draw

Allianz Suisse Open Gstaad - Doubles
- Doubles, 2010 Allianz Suisse Open Gstaad